Two for the Money is a 2005 American sports-drama film directed by D. J. Caruso and starring Al Pacino, Matthew McConaughey, Rene Russo, Armand Assante, and Carly Pope. The film is about the world of sports gambling. It was released on October 7, 2005. This was the first Morgan Creek movie distributed by Universal Pictures since Coupe de Ville in 1990.

Plot
Brandon Lang is a former college football star who, after sustaining a career-ending injury, takes a job handicapping football games. His success at choosing winners catches the eye of Walter Abrams, the slick head of one of the biggest sports consulting operations in the United States. Walter takes Brandon under his wing, and soon they are making tremendous amounts of money.

Lang's in-depth knowledge of the game, leagues, and players brings in big winnings and bigger clients. Abrams's cable television show, The Sports Advisors, skyrockets in popularity when he adds Lang's slick "John Anthony" persona to the desk, infuriating Jerry Sykes, who up to now has been Walter's in-house expert. Lang's total image is remade with a new car, new wardrobe, and a new look, with the assistance of Walter's wife, Toni, a hair stylist.

Things suddenly go south, however, when Lang begins playing his hunches instead of doing his homework. He loses his touch and is even physically assaulted by the thugs of a gambler who lost a great deal of money following Lang's advice. Abrams and Lang's once-solid relationship sours.

Lang's new high-rolling lifestyle depends entirely on his ability to predict the outcomes of the games. Millions are at stake by the time he places his last bet, and Abrams, a recovering gambling addict and alcoholic, grows increasingly unstable. He secretly begins gambling all of his own money on Lang's picks and becomes suspicious that Lang is having an affair with his wife.

The film concludes with Lang's predictions coming true for the last game, both of which he allegedly determines by flipping coins in a bathroom, as he leaves New York and takes a job as coach of a junior league football team.

Cast
Al Pacino as Walter Abrams 
Matthew McConaughey as Brandon Lang
Rene Russo as Toni Abrams
Armand Assante as C.M. Novian
Carly Pope as Tammy
Jeremy Piven as Jerry Sykes
Jaime King as Alexandria
Ralph Garman as Reggie
Charles Carroll as Chuck Adler
Ildiko Ferenczi as Friend
Veena Sood as G.A. Hostess

Reception
Two for the Money received generally negative reviews from critics. Rotten Tomatoes reported that 22% of critics gave the film positive reviews based on 110 reviews with an average score of 4.7/10. Its consensus states that "Despite its sportsmanlike swagger, Two for the Moneys aimless plot isn't worth betting on." The film's box office receipts came to only $22,991,379 in the United States and $30,526,509 worldwide, against a production budget of $35 million. The film also got mixed to average reviews on review aggregator Metacritic, where it scored 50 out of a 100, based on 29 critical reviews. Roger Ebert gave the film 3.5 out of 4, while Nick Schager of Slant Magazine gave it 2 out of 4, and saying in his opening comments: "Substitute The Devil’s Advocate’s satanic legal scheming with unethical sports gambling practices and you’ve got Two for the Money." Two for the Money also received 48% from Cinafilm, who was basing it on 507 reviews, as well as a C from Reeling Reviews.

Home media
Two for the Money was released on DVD and VHS on January 17, 2006. It was the last film released by Morgan Creek Productions to receive a VHS release.

References

External links

2005 crime drama films
American crime drama films
American football films
2000s English-language films
Films directed by D. J. Caruso
Films scored by Christophe Beck
Films set in New York City
Films shot in New York City
Films about gambling
Morgan Creek Productions films
Films with screenplays by Dan Gilroy
Universal Pictures films
2005 drama films
2005 films
2000s American films